William Morrow Knox Olcott (August 27, 1862 – May 10, 1933) was an American lawyer and politician from New York City.

Early life
He was born on August 27, 1862, in New York City to John N. Olcott and Euphemia Helen Knox. Future Congressman J. Van Vechten Olcott and mining engineer Eben Erskine Olcott were his brothers.

He graduated from City College in 1881, and from Columbia Law School in 1883.

Career
He practiced law and entered politics as a Republican.

In November 1893, he ran for judge of the New York City Court, but was defeated. He was a member of the Board of Aldermen from January 1895 until his appointment as New York County District Attorney

He was appointed New York County District Attorney in December 1896 to fill the vacancy caused by the death of John R. Fellows. In November 1897, he ran on the Republican ticket to succeed himself, but was defeated by Democrat Asa Bird Gardiner.

In December 1897, Olcott was appointed by Governor Frank S. Black, a judge of the New York City Court, to fill the vacancy caused by the resignation of Robert Anderson Van Wyck who had been elected Mayor. He left the bench at the end of 1898, and resumed his private practice as a partner of Ex-Governor Black in the firm of Black, Olcott, Gruber & Bonynge.

He was a delegate to the 1904 Republican National Convention and to the New York State Constitutional Convention of 1915.

Personal life
On December 6, 1888, he married Jessica Augusta Baldwin, and their son was Nellson Olcott, who became an Assistant District Attorney under Edward Swann and Joab H. Banton.

In January 1930, his first wife died aboard the steamer Rome on the return voyage from Italy. In June 1931, he married Florence A. Cobbett (died 1951).

Sources
SMOKED AND MADE A TICKET in NYT on October 18, 1893
THE CITY'S OFFICIAL VOTE in NYT on November 24, 1894
OLCOTT TAKES HIS OFFICE in NYT on December 20, 1896
REPUBLICANS NAME OLCOTT in NYT on October 8, 1897
OFFICIAL COUNT OF VOTES in NYT on November 21, 1897
BLACK TO MOVE TO CITY in NYT on December 12, 1898
BLACK TO FIGHT JEROME in NYT on December 6, 1902
MRS. W.K. OLCOTT DIES ON LINER AT SEA, his first wife's obit, in NYT on January 25, 1930 (subscription required)
W.M.K. OLCOTT WEDS in NYT on July 1, 1931 (subscription required)
W.M.K. OLCOTT, EX-JUDGE, DEAD in NYT on May 11, 1933 (subscription required)
MRS. WILLIAM M.K. OLCOTT, his second wife's obit, in NYT on July 18, 1951 (subscription required)

1862 births
1933 deaths
Columbia Law School alumni
New York County District Attorneys
City College of New York alumni
New York (state) Republicans